is a Japanese rugby union player who plays as a fullback.

In his home country he plays for the Toyota Industries Shuttles whom he joined in 2015.   He was also named in the first ever  squad which will compete in Super Rugby from the 2016 season.

References

1992 births
Living people
Japanese rugby union players
Rugby union fullbacks
Toyota Industries Shuttles Aichi players
Sportspeople from Nagasaki Prefecture
Sunwolves players
University of Tsukuba alumni